The Plum Village Monastery is a Buddhist monastery of the Plum Village Tradition in the Dordogne, southern France near the city of Bordeaux. It was founded by two Vietnamese monastics, Thích Nhất Hạnh (a Zen master and Buddhist monk) and Chân Không (a Buddhist nun), in 1982.

History

After being refused the right to return to Vietnam due to the Vietnam War, Thích Nhất Hạnh formed a small mindfulness community 100 miles southeast of Paris at the village of Fontvannes called "the Sweet Potato" after the food that poor Vietnamese people eat. Following Thích Nhất Hạnh's expulsion from Singapore following illegal attempts to rescue Vietnamese boat people, he settled in France and began to lead mindfulness retreats.

In 1981, the Sweet Potato community held its first summer retreat, which attracted more people than it could accommodate. Thích Nhất Hạnh then traveled south with Chân Không to find a larger site. They found a piece of land in Thénac, Dordogne, which seemed ideal. The landowner, Mr. Dézon, didn't want to sell, so they continued looking. Later that year, a hailstorm destroyed the vineyards on Mr. Dézon's property and he was forced to put his land on the market. Nhất Hạnh bought the land and called it Upper Hamlet. Initially, these two hamlets were named Persimmon Village, but it soon became clear that plums fared much better on the rocky soil, so it became Plum Village.

Each year the community hosts a four-week Summer Opening retreat, which has grown increasingly popular in recent years. Attendance has grown from 232 people in total in 1983 to over 800 guests at a time in 2015. In addition, the community hosts a variety of retreats year round, such as the Wake Up Retreat for young adults, the 21-Day Retreat for more experienced laypeople, and the 90-day Winter (Rains) Retreat.

Practice
Aside from practice Zen Buddhism, The Plum Village practices Engaged Buddhism, a application of buddhist teaching to the current world to help solve social problems. 
 
The following is the schedule for an average day at Plum Village (Làng Mai):
5:00 am: Rise
6:00 am: Sitting and walking meditation
7:00 am: Breakfast
9:00 am: Dharma Talk / Class / Presentation / Mindful work period
11:30 am: Walking meditation
12:30 pm: Lunch
1:30 pm: Rest
3:00 pm: Service (working) meditation
6:00 pm: Optional dinner
8:00 pm: Personal study, Happiness Meeting, Beginning Anew
9:30 pm: Noble silence begins
10:00 pm: Lights out
Throughout the day, visitors and members of the Plum Village hear the sound of a gong ring through the Upper Hamlet. When this happens all members are expected to cease what they are doing and pause for a moment of mindful silence

Hamlets
Today, Plum Village is made up of four major residential hamlets. Upper Hamlet houses approximately 65 monks and laymen. Lower Hamlet houses over 40 nuns and laywomen. Son Ha Temple houses approximately 20 monks and the New Hamlet, 20 minutes away by bus, houses approximately 40 nuns and laywomen. 

There are two additional hamlets that open up during the Summer Opening retreat, which are open for all guests. 

Plum Village has one sister monastery in Europe, the European Institute of Applied Buddhism (EIAB) in Waldbröl, Germany, 
and three in the United States: Blue Cliff Monastery in Pine Bush, New York, Deer Park Monastery (Tu Viện Lộc Uyển) in Escondido, California, and Magnolia Grove Monastery in Batesville, Mississippi.

There are also branches in Thailand and Hong Kong.

See also
 Blue Cliff Monastery
 Deer Park Monastery
 Magnolia Grove Monastery
 Engaged Buddhism

References

External links

Plum Village
Lang Mai - Plum Village site in Vietnamese
Plum Village site in French
European Institute of Applied Buddhism (EIAB)
Community of Mindful Living Community based on the practice of Plum Village
Thai Plum Village

Zen Buddhist monasteries
Buddhist monasteries in France
Buddhist temples in France
Buildings and structures in Dordogne
Plum Village Tradition
Overseas Vietnamese Buddhist temples
Asian-French culture
Vietnamese diaspora in France